Orford may refer to:

Places
 Orford, Cheshire, a suburb of Warrington, England
 Orford, Suffolk, England
 Orford Castle
 Orford Ness
 Orford (UK Parliament constituency)
 Orford, Quebec, in the Eastern Townships of Quebec, Canada
 Mont Orford, a ski resort in Quebec, Canada
 Orford (electoral district)
 Orford, Ontario, a township in Kent County
 Orford, New Hampshire, United States
 Port Orford, Oregon, United States
 Orford, Tasmania, Australia
 Orford, Victoria, Australia

Other uses
 Orford Copper Company, forerunner of Vale Limited
 Orford (surname)
 Earl of Orford, a title in the Peerage of England, including most notably:
 Edward Russell, 1st Earl of Orford (1653–1727), English naval officer and First Lord of the Admiralty
 Robert Walpole, 1st Earl of Orford (1676–1745), first Prime Minister of Great Britain
 Horace Walpole, 4th Earl of Orford (1717–1797), British politician and writer